is a city located in Ibaraki Prefecture, Japan. , the city had an estimated population of 138,446 in 56,097 households and a population density of 1120 persons per km². The percentage of the population aged over 65 was 28.98%.

Geography
Koga is located in the extreme southwestern corner of Ibaraki Prefecture. Located almost in the center of the Kanto Plain, the city is very flat. The Tone River flows eastward in the southern part of the city and the Watarase River flows through the west and joins the Tone River north of the Tonegawa Bridge.The altitude of the northern part is slightly higher than that of the southern part, and the rivers that flow through the city flow from north to south except for the Tone River.

Surrounding municipalities
Ibaraki Prefecture
 Yūki
 Bandō
 Sakai
 Goka
 Yachiyo
Saitama Prefecture
 Kuki
Kazo
Tochigi Prefecture
Oyama
Tochigi
Nogi

Climate
Koga has a Humid continental climate (Köppen Cfa) characterized by warm summers and cool winters with light snowfall.

Demographics
Per Japanese census data, the population of Koga peaked around the year 2000 and has declined slightly since.

History
Koga was settled in the  Jōmon period and already known as a ferry port on the Watarase River in the Nara period and is mentioned in the Man'yōshū. During the Heian period it was the site of an iron smelter and kilns for production of ceramics and roof tiles and was one of the largest centers for iron production in eastern Japan . During the Muromachi period it was the location of the Koga kubō, a secondary government created by the Ashikaga shogunate to rule eastern Japan. In the Sengoku period, it developed into a castle town and during the Edo period became the seat of the daimyō of Koga Domain under the Edo period Tokugawa shogunate and a station on the Nikkō Kaidō highway.

The town of Koga was established on April 1, 1889, with the creation of the modern municipalities system. It was raised to city status on August 1, 1950. On September 12, 2005, Koga absorbed the towns of Sanwa and Sōwa (both from Sashima District) to create the new and expanded city of Koga. The new city hall is now located at the former town of Sōwa.

Government
Koga has a mayor-council form of government with a directly elected mayor and a unicameral city council of 24 members. Koga contributes three members to the Ibaraki Prefectural Assembly. In terms of national politics, the city is part of Ibaraki 7th district of the lower house of the Diet of Japan.

Economy
Koga was known in the Meiji era through the prewar Shōwa era as a center for sericulture. At present, the economy is highly industrialized, with the number of factories as second within Ibaraki Prefecture, after Hitachi city.

Education
Koga  has 23 public elementary schools and nine public middle schools operated by the city government, and five public high schools operated by the Ibaraki Prefectural Board of Education. In addition, there is one private high school.

Transportation
bus
 JR East – Tōhoku Main Line

Highway

Sister city relations
 – Sanhe, Hebei, China

Local attractions
site of Koga Castle
site of Koga Kubo residence
 Suzume-jinja
 Hase Kannon temple
Koga History Museum
 Sogo Koen Park, near the Watarase River, was formally a summer palace for a local daimyo. It has two restored 17th century farmhouses, like including the Nakayama house and Takami Senseki house/museum.
Navel Park in Sowa-machi has outdoor and barbecue facilities for families.
Koga west of the station is old and has many old buildings. Many of the streets are cobbled.
Tenkoku Art Museum.

Notable people
Hideo Jinpu, politician
Kawanabe Kyōsai, artist
Okuhara Seiko, artist
Reiko Okano, manga artist
Koji Yamamuro, Olympic gymnast

References

External links

Official Website 

Cities in Ibaraki Prefecture
Koga, Ibaraki